Hemidactylus alfarraji is a species of gecko. It is endemic to Saudi Arabia.

References

Hemidactylus
Reptiles described in 2016
Endemic fauna of Saudi Arabia
Reptiles of the Middle East